Lieutenant Colonel Timothy John Gerald Stevens Purbrick  (born 18 April 1964) is a British Army officer of the Royal Lancers who took part in Operation Desert Storm.

Early life
Purbrick was born in 1964, the son of William Purbrick.

Career
Purbrick is the Commanding Officer of the British Cultural Property Protection Unit (CPPU), which was created in September 2018 in order for the British government to fulfil its obligations after it signed the Hague Convention for the Protection of Cultural Property in the Event of Armed Conflict (1954) in 2017.

Personal life
In 1991, Purbrick married Henrietta Emily Charlotte Nevill (b. 21 June 1964), daughter of Lord Rupert Nevill, and a goddaughter of Prince Philip, Duke of Edinburgh. Henrietta was later granted the rank of a marquess's daughter in 2003. They have four children.

See also
 Monuments Men

References 

Living people
17th/21st Lancers officers
British Army personnel of the Gulf War
Officers of the Order of the British Empire
People educated at Eton College
Alumni of the University of Edinburgh
1964 births
Queen's Royal Lancers officers